A fidalgo was a traditional title in the Portuguese nobility or gentry, related to the  Spanish cognate hidalgo.

Fidalgo may also refer to:

People
Alfonso Fidalgo, Spanish paralympic athlete
Agustín Fidalgo, Argentine footballer
Ivan Fidalgo, Portuguese footballer
João Fidalgo, Portuguese volleyball player
José Fidalgo, Portuguese model and actor
Matilde Fidalgo, Portuguese footballer
Miguel Fidalgo, better known as just Fidalgo, Portuguese footballer
Salvador Fidalgo, Spanish explorer of the Pacific Northwest

Places
 Fidalgo, Washington, an unincorporated community
 Fidalgo Island, an island in Skagit County, Washington, United States

Other uses
 Fidalgo (sternwheeler), a 1920 Puget Sound steam scow
 Fidalgo River, a river of Piauí, Brazil